The fourth season of the American television series Person of Interest premiered on September 23, 2014. The season is produced by Kilter Films, Bad Robot Productions, and Warner Bros. Television, with Jonathan Nolan, Greg Plageman, J. J. Abrams, and Bryan Burk serving as executive producers and Plageman serving as showrunner. 

The series was renewed for a fourth season in March 2014 and stars Jim Caviezel, Kevin Chapman, Amy Acker, Sarah Shahi and Michael Emerson. The series revolves around a team led by a mysterious reclusive billionaire computer programmer, Harold Finch, who has developed a computer program for the federal government known as "the Machine" that is capable of collating all sources of information to predict terrorist acts and to identify people planning them, as well as detecting all lesser crimes, known as "irrelevant" crimes. The focus of the season involves the team's fight against Samaritan, a mass surveillance system that aims to destroy the Machine.

The season premiered on September 23, 2014 on CBS and ended on May 5, 2015. Viewership for the season averaged 12.22 million viewers, ranking as the 21st most watched series of the 2014-15 television season. The season received highly positive reviews from critics, with the writing, performances and Samaritan's thematic value garnering praise. One of its episodes, "If-Then-Else", received near-unanimous praise from critics and audience and was deemed one of the series' best episodes. In May 2015, CBS renewed the series for a fifth season, which would be later announced to be the final season.

Season summary
After the events of the previous season, the team is living separately in hiding. They continue to work on cases, but must now also evade Samaritan, which lacks the restrictions and human-oriented perspective Finch built into the Machine, and which is seeking to resolve perceived problems of human violence by reshaping society, sometimes violently. Samaritan manipulates the NSA, fixes elections, triggers stock market crashes, kills those seen as threats, changes data to gain results perceived as beneficial, buys useful corporations, and continues building an organization to support its own goals. 

Samaritan and the Machine meet via human proxies as the only two of their kind, and discuss their essential differences, disagreeing strongly on whether freewill or firm guidance is more beneficial to humanity. They part with the understanding that Samaritan will seek to destroy the Machine, and Samaritan engineers a general electrical failure across the entire United States to do so. Samaritan operatives capture Shaw, leading to a brief search by Reese and Root before the Machine instructs them to stop. As Finch finishes copying the Machine's core systems into a temporary portable storage system, it apologizes to Finch for its failure to prevent the present situation, expresses concern that it may have made poor choices under unforeseen circumstances and gratitude for its creation, and ceases to function. The team then leaves in order to face more Samaritan operatives, preparing for their last stand.

Cast and characters

Main
 Jim Caviezel as John Reese
 Kevin Chapman as Lionel Fusco
 Amy Acker as Samantha Groves/Root
 Sarah Shahi as Sameen Shaw
 Michael Emerson as Harold Finch

Recurring 
 John Nolan as John Greer
 Cara Buono as Martine Rousseau
 Winston Duke as Dominic Besson
 Enrico Colantoni as Carl Elias
 Wrenn Schmidt as Dr. Iris Campbell
 Andreas Damm as Romeo
 Jamie Hector as Lincoln "Link" Cordell
 Annie Ilonzeh as Harper Rose
 Jessica Pimentel as Floyd
 John Doman as Ross Garrison
 Camryn Manheim as Control
 Nick Tarabay as Devon Grice
 David Valcin as Anthony S. Marconi/Scarface
 Adria Arjona as Dani Silva
 Oakes Fegley as Gabriel Hayward
 Jessica Hecht as Elizabeth Bridges
 Luke Kleintank as Caleb Phipps
 Julian Ovenden as Jeremy Lambert
 Quinn Shephard as Claire Mahoney
 Paige Turco as Zoe Morgan
 Theodora Woolley as Brooks
 Brett Cullen as Nathan Ingram
 Taraji P. Henson as Joss Carter
 Robert Manning, Jr. as Zachary
 Elizabeth Marvel as Alicia Corwin
 Al Sapienza as Raymond Terney

Notable guests
 Navid Negahban as Ali Hasan
 Ryan O'Nan as Andre Cooper
 Jason Ritter as Simon Lee
 Adrian Bellani as Tomas Koroa
 James Le Gros as Bruce Moran
 Michael Gaston as Mike Richelli
 Michael Potts as Travers
 William Jackson Harper as Strobel
 Maddie Corman as Leslie Thompson
 Blair Brown as Emma Blake
 Bella Dayne as Anna Mueller
 Heléne Yorke as Lauren Buchanan
 Patrick Kennedy as Dr. Shane Edwards
 Katheryn Winnick as Frankie Wells
 Aasif Mandvi as Sulaiman Khan
 Zachary Booth as Chase Patterson

Episodes

Production

Development
The series was renewed for a fourth season in March 2014. Executive producer and showrunner Greg Plageman previewed the season, "there are actually two wars going on: there's rise of the Brotherhood, led by Dominic, that's the municipal war. And then there's the larger war between the Machine and Samaritan"

Writing
Amy Acker commented on her character's feelings for Shaw, "Well... There's definitely a lot of flirtation with Shaw. They're not shying away from that, so that seems to suggest that she definitely likes her. It seems like she's not tied to one gender or the other, but I think her No. 1 crush is definitely Shaw." Sarah Shahi also commented on the same topic, "I think Shaw is starting to agree with that. But because Shaw's country presumed her dead and she kind of had to escape her own 'death', I never pictured it as, 'OK, she's part of a team' but 'She needs extra eyes, ears and hands working to help keep her safe.' She's a lone wolf. Does she have some attachments after all this time? I think the dog, Bear, has become an attachment for her. With Root, even though I agree with Amy and I think that Shaw probably does feel the same, is that anything that would ever keep her there? I don't think so. Even that is something Shaw can walk away from at any time."

Kevin Chapman also commented on his character now sharing his job with Reese, "I think that Reese is something that Fusco needs in his life at this point. Of course he's putting a real cramp in Fusco's style — here's a guy that for three seasons has kind of tortured Fusco from the shadows and now all of a sudden he's sitting across the desk from him. It's really funny to see how the relationship is going to evolve because, as you know, Reese is not a guy always plays by the rules, so how is he going to handle working a very real job with a very real detective while needing to play by these rules?" Enrico Colantoni explained more about Elias and his new role in the season, "We really spent a lot of time on Elias, which is always fun. And the more time I get to spend with Michael Emerson and Jim Caviezel, I'm a happy guy. Elias is such a cool character to play – he's sardonic, he's ironic, he's vicious, he's so unlike other villains on TV. Spending all those days on a real, larger arc hasn’t happened since he was 'Charlie Burton' in the first season. We find out so much more about him and Scarface and their lives. It's rare that TV shows take the time to develop characters like that."

The eleventh episode of the season, "If-Then-Else", saw a significant shift in the series' course. The majority of the episode consisted of simulations, by the Machine, of various scenarios resulting in different outcomes, which allowed the series to explore humor and outlandish elements that wouldn't be typically included in the series. The episode also featured the supposed death of Sameen Shaw, a decision which Greg Plageman said was due to the actress' pregnancy. Shahi reinstated that it wasn't a permanent exit, claiming that the point of the episodes were to give more priority to the team in their fight against Samaritan. Following the episode's airing, Shahi's name was removed from the opening credits. "M.I.A." would later confirm that Shaw was still alive.

For the final episode, "YHWH", Jonathan Nolan teased the episode by saying, "It's going to be a very bumpy ride. It's going to go badly for our guys, and it's going to be a giant mess, which is how we usually like to construct the end of every season." He also warned that it would have a cliffhanger, saying "I don't think it would be the end of the season for us without having some kind of big-ass twist or surprise. That's kind of our hallmark thing, and we aim to please this year, as with every year." The episode featured the shooting of Dominic Besson and Carl Elias, with the latter playing a very important role on the series since the first season. Plageman said about writing their deaths, "It's just terrible — I can't stand it. Because they've been on the show for such extended periods of time, they start to believe that they can cheat death, and when the reaper finally comes — they give you a hug, but they always wonder, 'Well, am I going to come back in flashback?'" The episode's use of "Welcome to the Machine" by Pink Floyd was planned by the producers for a long time but deemed that the episode felt the right place to add the song.

Casting
All lead actors returned to the season, with the exception of Taraji P. Henson as her character was killed off. In April 2015, Henson was announced to return for a guest appearance on "Terra Incognita" through the use of flashbacks. The episode revealed that her appearance wasn't the result of flashbacks, but hallucinations, with Greg Plageman saying that they deemed the episode "a truly psychological episode." The producers wanted Henson to return at some point and they managed to get her for a guest appearance, although due to her commitment to Empire and film career, her appearance had to be done until the 20th episode.

In July 2014, Cara Buono joined the series in a recurring role as Martine Rousseau, "a femme fatale who's uniquely qualified to navigate the new world order of Season 4 of the procedural drama." Plageman said of her character, "she's extremely capable, she's versatile and, like Root in many ways, a chameleon." In August 2014, Monique Gabriela Curnen joined the series in a recurring role as Captain Felicia Moreno, "Fusco’s latest (and hopefully not corrupt!) boss at the 8th precinct." Despite being deemed a recurring role, she only appears in "Wingman". Winston Duke also joined the series as Dominic Besson, one of the main antagonists of the season.

In August 2014, it was announced that Jason Ritter would guest star as Simon Lee, "a whip-smart, political Wunderkind with an incredible gift of foresight." In November 2014, Blair Brown joined in a guest role as Emma Blake, "an elegant and warm former public school teacher." In February 2015, Aasif Mandvi was reported to guest star as Sulaiman Khan, "a bright but demanding tech tycoon." In the same month, Katheryn Winnick was announced to guest star as Frankie Wells, "a resourceful, relentless bounty hunter who enjoys her job of chasing down bad guys perhaps a bit too much."

Release

Broadcast
In May 2014, CBS announced that the series would keep its time slot, airing Tuesdays at 10 p.m., airing after NCIS and NCIS: New Orleans. In June 2014, CBS reported that the third season would premiere on September 23, 2014. The season ended on May 5, 2015.

Marketing
On July 26, 2014, the cast and crew attended the 2014 San Diego Comic-Con to discuss and promote the season and revealing a trailer for the season. On October 12, 2014, the cast attended the 2014 New York Comic-Con to promote the series and showing a preview of "Prophets". 

Similar to the previous season, the midpoint of the season was advertised as part of a trilogy, consisting of "The Cold War", "If-Then-Else", and "Control-Alt-Delete". Plageman previewed the episodes, especially "If-Then-Else", deeming it a "massive, cool, time-shifting episode that's going to blow some people's mind. Something totally shocking happens." Nolan talked about "Control-Alt-Delete", saying "Right when you get to a really really juicy part of the story where the audience can't wait to find out exactly what happens next, you switch gears and do something different."

Home media release
The fourth season was released on Blu-ray and DVD in region 1 on August 11, 2015, in region 2 on September 5, 2016, and in region 4 on September 2, 2015.

In 2014, Warner Bros. Television Studios announced that it sold the off-network SVOD of the series to Netflix. On December 30, 2015, the season became available to stream on Netflix. On September 22, 2020, the series left the service and was added to HBO Max on January 23, 2021.

Reception

Viewers

Critical reception
The fourth season received highly positive reviews, with critics praising the thematic value of the Samaritan storyline. On Rotten Tomatoes, the season has an approval rating of 100% and average rating of 8.28 out of 10 based on 12 reviews. The site's critical consensus is, "Thought-provoking, grounded sci-fi makes season four of Person of Interest as compelling as it is timely."

Mike Hale of The New York Times wrote, "The Season 4 premiere... is a decent demonstration of the show's charms: some action, some humor, some dystopian high-tech intrigue and an ensemble of actors who seem to be having fun and whose characters actually seem to care for one another." Emily St. James of Vox wrote positively about the season, deeming the series as "the second coming of The X-Files", writing, "Over its four seasons, Person of Interest has slowly but surely built a mythology around its central Machine. The series blows up its central conceit as often as it possibly can, to reveal newer, bigger depths in its mythology. In that respect, it's a much more disciplined show than The X-Files, which only returned to its ongoing alien colonization storyline for a handful of episodes each season and very quickly ran out of anywhere to go with it. But Person of Interest has a couple of decades of TV serialization post-X-Files to draw upon, time that has been spent in figuring out how best to unspool these stories so they can keep going and going and going." After the season ended, Matt Fowler of IGN gave the season an "amazing" 9.3 out of 10 rating and wrote in his verdict, "Person of Interest delivered another twisting, tragic season of sinister surveillance while keeping the debate about privacy and security alive and meaningful. It's a stupendous, action-packed series that deserves a larger share of the online conversation."

The episode "If-Then-Else" garnered near-unanimous praise from critics and audiences alike, with many considering the episode to be the best entry in the series. Fowler gave the episode a perfect rating of 10 out 10, indicating it to a "masterpiece", and praised the simulation format, the action scenes, the emotional value, and the ending. He called the episode "next-level inventive" and a "jolting, exciting, heart-wrenching episode". Fowler said the ending scene "crushed" him, and he also offered praise to the significance of the flashbacks to the chess games. Alexa Planje of The A.V. Club gave the episode an A rating, and in her review, said that though the task of executing a story structured like "If-Then-Else" was difficult, the episode did so "elegantly"she cited the "interesting score, vibrant color work, and humor" as the key elements. Planje said the episode "aces every scenario" during the simulation segments, and appreciated how the episode transformed itself from what appeared to be a "standard mission-focused story" into a "moving ode" to Shaw. She also praised the episode's exploration of the parallels between being a human and being a machine. Shant Istamboulian of Entertainment Weekly lauded Emerson's performance in the flashbacks and felt the season marked the series' "creative peak". He concluded by saying "Moving like a rocket, this episode is fast, funny, exciting, and, ultimately, sad, ending with what seems like the loss of another team member. We'll have to wait until next week for the outcome, but as it stands, "If-Then-Else" is an instant classic." Surette also had high praise for the episode, calling it "playful, mind-bending, heart-breaking, and flat-out excellent." He praised the episode's incorporation of its "recurring theme of sacrifice", and called the flashbacks "as fascinating and provocative as anything the series has done." Surette cited his favorite part of the episode as the exploration of the Machine's perspective, and additionally praised the humorous segments.

References

External links 
 

Person of Interest seasons
2014 American television seasons
2015 American television seasons